Alan Júnior Martins de Oliveira (born 10 April 1993), simply known as Alan Júnior, is a Brazilian professional footballer who plays for Portuguese club São João Ver as a forward.

Club career
On 3 February 2013, Alan Júnior made his professional debut with Braga B in a 2012–13 Segunda Liga match against Tondela.

On 6 June 2017, Alan Júnior signed a five-season deal with Portuguese champions Benfica, being assigned to its reserve team.

References

External links

Stats and profile at LPFP 

1993 births
Living people
Brazilian footballers
Brazilian expatriate footballers
Association football forwards
Liga Portugal 2 players
Segunda Divisão players
S.C. Braga B players
AD Fafe players
S.L. Benfica B players
Associação Académica de Coimbra – O.A.F. players
S.C. Farense players
Leixões S.C. players
C.D. Trofense players
A.D. Sanjoanense players
Brazilian expatriate sportspeople in Portugal
Expatriate footballers in Portugal
People from Assis